Enrico Venti (Born 30 December 1978) is an Italian actor and comedian. Better known as Ivo Avido, his best known character, he is famous for his participation in television programs such as Mai dire... on Italia 1. With Marcello Macchia, he leads Shortcut Productions, the company that produces their own videos. From 2011 he is a member of the crew of Lo Zoo di 105.

In 2015 he took part in his first movie, Italiano medio.

Filmography
Italiano medio (2015)
On Air: Storia di un successo (2016)
Quel bravo ragazzo (2016)
Omicidio all'italiana (2017)

TV Series
 La Villa di Lato (2009)
 Drammi Medicali (2009)
 Lost in Google (2012)
 Mario (2013-2014)

References

Italian male film actors
Italian male television actors
1978 births
Living people
Italian comedians
People of Abruzzese descent